Diatraea bellifactella is a moth in the family Crambidae. It was described by Harrison Gray Dyar Jr. in 1911. It is found in Brazilian states of São Paulo and Parana and Panama.

References

Chiloini
Moths described in 1911